Namaquaphasma is a genus of insects in the family Mantophasmatidae. It is a monotypic genus consisting of the species Namaquaphasma ookiepense, which is endemic to Northern Cape Province, South Africa. Its type locality is Ookiep.

References

Mantophasmatidae
Monotypic insect genera
Insects of South Africa
Endemic fauna of South Africa